Geraldine Custer (born January 1, 1955) is an American politician who has served in the Montana House of Representatives from the 39th district since 2015.

Early life 
Custer was born in Miles City, Montana, and graduated Melstone High School in 1973. She attended Eastern Montana College, and later served as the county clerk and recorder of Rosebud County, Montana, for thirty-five years.

Montana House of Representatives 
Custer was elected to the Montana House of Representatives in 2014, and assumed office in January 2015.

Personal life 
Custer resides in Forsyth, Montana. She has two daughters, Amy and Arica.

References

1955 births
Living people
Republican Party members of the Montana House of Representatives
Women state legislators in Montana
21st-century American politicians
21st-century American women politicians
People from Rosebud County, Montana